Vianópolis is a  small municipality in the center of the Brazilian state of Goiás.

Location
Vianópolis is located 90 km. from the state capital, Goiânia.  Highway connections are made by BR-457 / GO-010 / GO-330 /  passing through the cities of  Bonfinópolis, Leopoldo de Bulhões and Silvânia.  It is in the Pires do Rio Microregion and has boundaries with Orizona, Pires do Rio, São Miguel do Passa Quatro and Silvânia.

Political information
Mayor: Antônio Divino de Resende (January 2005)
City council: 09 members
Eligible voters: 8,328 (December/2007)

Demographics
Population density: 12.77 inhabitants/km2 (2007)
Population in 1980: 7,934
Population in 2007: 12,187
Urban population: 9,105 (2007)
Rural population: 3,082 (2007)
Population growth rate:   2.27% 1996/2007

The economy
The economy is based on subsistence agriculture, cattle raising, services, public administration, and small transformation industries.

Industrial units: 32 (2007)
Commercial units: 143 (2007)
Dairy: - Ind. e Com. de Laticínios Ponte Funda Ltda (22/05/2006)
Financial institutions (01/06/2005):  Banco do Brasil S.A., BRADESCO S.A.
Cattle herd: 52,500 head (12,200 milk cows) (2006)
Main crops: cotton, rice, bananas, sugarcane, barley, beans, manioc, corn, sorghum, tangerines, wheat, tomatoes, and soybeans (25,000 hectares).

Agricultural data 2006
Number of farms:  656
Total area:  37,221 ha.
Area of permanent crops: 2,597 ha.
Area of perennial crops: 13,648 ha.
Area of natural pasture:  15,018 ha.
Area of woodland and forests:  5,391 ha.
Persons dependent on farming:  1,450
Farms with tractors: 124
Number of tractors:  322
Cattle herd:  52,500 head IBGE

Education (2006)
Schools: 13
Classrooms: 97
Teachers: 179
Students: 3,641
Higher education: none
Adult literacy rate: 87.6% (2000) (national average was 86.4%)

Health (2007)
Hospitals: 1
Hospital beds: 37
Ambulatory clinics: 8
Infant mortality rate: 22.64 (2000) (national average was 33.0).

Municipal Human Development Index
MHDI:  0.784
State ranking:  24 (out of 242 municipalities in 2000)
National ranking:  970 (out of 5,507 municipalities in 2000)  For the complete list see Frigoletto.com

See also 
List of municipalities in Goiás
Microregions of Goiás

References

Frigoletto
 Sepin

Municipalities in Goiás